The Christian Quarter (Ḥārat al-Naṣārā; , Ha-Rova ha-Notsri) is one of the four quarters of the walled Old City of Jerusalem, the other three being the Jewish Quarter, the Muslim Quarter and the Armenian Quarter. The Christian Quarter is situated in the northwestern corner of the Old City, extending from the New Gate in the north, along the western wall of the Old City as far as the Jaffa Gate, along the Jaffa Gate - Western Wall route in the south, bordering on the Jewish and Armenian Quarters, as far as the Damascus Gate in the east, where it borders on the Muslim Quarter.  The Christian quarter contains about 40 Christian holy places. First among them is the Church of the Holy Sepulchre, Christianity's holiest place. Most of its residents are Palestinian Christians, despite their dwindling numbers.

Description

The Christian Quarter was built around the Church of the Holy Sepulchre, which is the heart of the quarter, and Christian churches and institutions are spread across much of the quarter. 
Besides the Church of the Holy Sepulchre, there are the patriarchal seats of many Christian denominations, including the Greek Orthodox Patriarchate of Jerusalem, which owns large tracts of the quarter, the Latin Patriarch of Jerusalem, the Greek Catholic Patriarchate of Jerusalem, the Coptic Patriarchate of Jerusalem and the Ethiopian Patriarchate of Jerusalem, while the Franciscan Monastery of St Saviour (often called by its Italian name, San Salvatore) is the seat of the Custody of the Holy Land.

The west–east David Street and north-south Christian Quarter Road, or simply Christian Road, are the principal market streets. Several hotels, including the Casa Nova Hotel and the Greek Catholic hotel, were built by the churches as places for religious visitors and pilgrims to stay. The quarter also contains museums, including one about the Greek Orthodox Patriarchate. In the southwestern part of the quarter there is a pool called Hezekiah's Pool or Patriarch's Pool that was traditionally used to store water for the area.

History

Late 19th century
In the 19th century, European countries sought to expand their influence in Jerusalem and began constructing several structures in the Christian Quarter. The Ottoman authorities attempted to halt European influence and established rules for buying land in the area, but personal interventions from the heads of those countries, including Wilhelm II of Germany and Franz Joseph of Austria, led to construction of some buildings for those countries' religious and secular authorities.

At the end of the 19th century, there was no further free land for development in the Christian Quarter. In the same period, the Suez Canal had opened and many Christians travelled to the Holy Land. This led to intensified competition between the European powers for influence in Jerusalem. France built hospitals, a monastery, and hostels for visitors outside the Old City adjacent to the Christian Quarter - an area which became known as the French area. The Russians located themselves in the nearby Russian Compound.

There was a natural desire for easy travel between the Christian Quarter and the new development, but at the time the Old City walls formed a barrier and travellers were forced to take an indirect path through either Jaffa Gate or Nablus Gate. In 1898, the Ottomans accepted the request of the European countries and breached a new gate in the Old City walls, in the area of the new development. The gate was called the New Gate.

Landmarks

Churches
Church of the Holy Sepulchre
Cathedral of Our Lady of the Annunciation (Melkite Greek Catholic church)
Co-Cathedral of the Most Holy Name of Jesus (Latin Catholic)
Church of the Redeemer (Lutheran)
Holy Trinity Cathedral (Russian Orthodox)
Church of St John the Baptist (Greek Orthodox)

Monasteries
Deir es-Sultan (Ethiopian)
Monastery of Saint Saviour (Franciscan)

Mosques
Mosque of Omar (Mamluk)
Al-Khanqah al-Salahiyya Mosque (Mamluk) at the site of the Crusader palace of the Latin Patriarch

Markets
Many of the streets function as typical oriental bazaars or suqs, with the David Street and Christian Quarter Road most prominent among them.
Suq Aftimos (19th century) covers much of the Muristan quarter

Relation to Armenian Quarter
Though formally separate from the main bulk of the Christian Quarter, which houses mostly Greek Orthodox and Roman Catholic sites, the Armenians consider their adjacent Armenian Quarter to be part of the Christian Quarter. The three Christian patriarchates of Jerusalem – the Greek Orthodox Patriarchate, the Latin Patriarchate of Jerusalem, and the Armenian Patriarchate of Jerusalem – as well as the government of Armenia, have all publicly expressed their opposition to any political division of the two quarters. The central reasons for the existence of a separate Armenian Quarter is the distinct language and culture of the Armenians, who, unlike the majority of Christians in Jerusalem, Israel and Palestine, are neither Arab nor Palestinian.

References

Notes

Citations

Sources

 
 

Neighbourhoods of Jerusalem
Christianity in Jerusalem
Arab neighborhoods in Jerusalem
Arab Christian communities in Israel
Palestinian Christian communities
Quarters (urban subdivision)